Herman Jesse Branson (January 7, 1942 – November 2, 2014) was an American basketball player.

Born in Graham, North Carolina, he played collegiately for Elon University.

He became known as the hoops legend at Elon, setting numerous basketball records, and still holding them today.

His Basketball Jersey (number 40) was retired after his time at Elon, and was temporarily taken out of retirement for his son Brian Branson to wear during his senior year. The Jersey now hangs in the Elon Scharr Center, moved from its place in the alumni gym.

Jesse married his sweetheart Barbra Tillman in 1962 until his own death. During his senior year in 1965, and throughout his NBA career, he had his first child, Brian Branson born in 1965

He was selected by the Philadelphia 76ers in the second round (18th pick overall) of the 1965 NBA Draft.

He played for the 76ers (1965–66) in the NBA for 5 games and for the New Orleans Buccaneers (1967–68) in the ABA for 78 games.

Branson died on November 2, 2014 in Gibsonville, North Carolina where he lived.

References

External links

1942 births
2014 deaths
American men's basketball players
Basketball players from North Carolina
Elon Phoenix men's basketball players
New Orleans Buccaneers players
People from Graham, North Carolina
Philadelphia 76ers draft picks
Philadelphia 76ers players
Small forwards
People from Gibsonville, North Carolina